The 10th International Film Festival of India was held from 3-16 January 1985 in New Delhi. For the first time, the festival had an international panorama of select short films, and documentaries, in an effort to create an identity for short films.
In 1986 when "Filmotsav" 86 was held in Calcutta, the Festival dates were changed from 3-17 January to 10-24 January.

Winners
Golden Peacock (Best Film):  "The Bostonians" by James Ivory "Ruthless Romance" by Eldar Ryazanov
Golden Peacock (Best Short Film) Narcissus (Canadian film)

References

1985 film festivals
10
1985 in Indian cinema